The 10th Congress of the Philippines (Filipino: Ikasampung Kongreso ng Pilipinas), composed of the Philippine Senate and House of Representatives, met from July 24, 1995, until June 5, 1998, during the last three years of Fidel Ramos's presidency. The convening of the 10th Congress followed the 1995 national elections, which replaced half of the Senate membership, and the entire membership of the House of Representatives.

Sessions
First Special Session: June 26 – July 7, 1995
First Regular Session: July 24, 1995 – June 7, 1996
Second Special Session: May 13 – June 21, 1996
Third Special Session: August 12 – 30, 1996
First Joint Session: April 1, June 3, 1996
Second Regular Session: July 22, 1996 – June 13, 1997
Fourth Special Session: January 6 – 31, 1997
Fifth Special Session: February 3 – 28, 1997
Second Joint Session: January 27, February 10, February 24, March 3, March 10 – 17, 1997
Third Regular Session: July 28, 1997 – June 5, 1998
Third Joint Session: February 16 – March 6, 1998
Sixth Special Session: March 16 – 20, 1998
Seventh Special Session: April 6 – 10, 1998
Eighth Special Session: April 12 – May 1, 1998

Legislation
Laws passed by the 10th Congress:

Intellectual Property Code of the Philippines (took effect on January 1, 1998).

Leadership

Senate
President of the Senate
Edgardo Angara (LDP) (1995)
Neptali Gonzales (LDP) (1995–1996)
Ernesto Maceda (NPC) (1996–1998)
Neptali Gonzales (LDP) (1998)
Senate President Pro-Tempore
Leticia Ramos-Shahani (Lakas-NUCD) (1995–1996)
Neptali Gonzales (LDP) (1995–1996, 1998)
Blas Ople (LDP) (1996–1998)
Majority Floor Leader
Alberto Romulo (LDP) (1995–1996)
Francisco Tatad (LDP) (1996–1998)
Franklin Drilon (Lakas-NUCD) (1998)
Minority Floor Leader
Edgardo Angara (1995–1996)
Neptali Gonzales (1996–1998)
Ernesto Maceda (1998)

House of Representatives
Speaker of the House of Representatives
Jose de Venecia Jr. (Lakas-NUCD, 4th District Pangasinan)
Deputy Speakers
Senior Deputy Speaker
Raul A. Daza (Liberal, 1st District Northern Samar)

Majority Floor Leader
Rodolfo Albano (NPC, 1st District Isabela)
Minority Floor Leader
Ronaldo Zamora (NPC, Lone District San Juan)

Members

Composition

Senate

House of Representatives

District representatives 

Notes

Sectoral representatives

See also
Congress of the Philippines
Senate of the Philippines
House of Representatives of the Philippines
1995 Philippine general election

References

External links

Further reading
Philippine House of Representatives Congressional Library

Congresses of the Philippines
Fifth Philippine Republic